The International Geomagnetic Reference Field (IGRF) is a standard mathematical description of the large-scale structure of the Earth's main magnetic field and its secular variation. It was created by fitting parameters of a mathematical model of the magnetic field to measured magnetic field data from surveys, observatories and satellites across the globe. The IGRF has been produced and updated under the direction of the International Association of Geomagnetism and Aeronomy (IAGA) since 1965.

The IGRF model covers a significant time span, and so is useful for interpreting historical data.  (This is unlike the World Magnetic Model, which is intended for navigation in the next few years.)  It is updated at 5-year intervals, reflecting the most accurate measurements available at that time.  The current 13th edition of the IGRF model (IGRF-13) was released in December 2019 and is valid from 1900 until 2025.  For the interval from 1945 to 2015, it is "definitive" (a "DGRF"), meaning that future updates are unlikely to improve the model in any significant way.

Spherical Harmonics 
The IGRF models the geomagnetic field  as a gradient of a magnetic scalar potential 

 

The magnetic scalar potential model consists of the Gauss coefficients which define a spherical harmonic expansion of 

where  is radial distance from the Earth's center,  is the maximum degree of the expansion,  is East longitude,
 is colatitude (the polar angle),  is the Earth's radius,
are the Schmidt normalized associated Legendre functions of degree  and order 
 
where

 

The Gauss coefficients are modeled as a piecewise-linear function of time with a 5 year step size.

See also 
 World Magnetic Model
 Geomagnetic latitude
 Magsat
 Ørsted (satellite)
 CHAMP (satellite)

References

External links 
 IGRF Model Description by IAGA
 Notes concerning correct use and limitations of IGRF

Geomagnetism
Magnetic field of the Earth